Labeobarbus leleupanus is a species of ray-finned fish in the family Cyprinidae. It is found only in Burundi. Its natural habitats are rivers, freshwater lakes, and inland deltas.

References

leleupanus
Fish described in 1959
Taxa named by Hubert Matthes
Taxonomy articles created by Polbot
Taxobox binomials not recognized by IUCN